The Fall of Five is the fourth book of the Lorien Legacies series by the pseudonymous author Pittacus Lore. It is the next book after The Rise of Nine.

The Fall of Five is the first book in the series to feature Number Five.

Characters
Number Four, John
Number Seven, Marina
Sam Goode
Number Six
Number Five
Number Nine
Number Ten, Ella
Number Eight
Sarah Hart
Malcolm Goode
Setrakus Ra
Bernie Cosar the Dog.

Plot
The Fall of Five opens with Sam, reliving his experience of torture from Setrakus Ra. He is then taken to Dulce Base before being rescued by Adam, a mogadorian, and his father, Malcolm. Adam holds off the Mogadorians while the other two escape. Upon their escape Malcolm says he worries that he got Adam killed.

We then move to Chicago with John Smith (Number Four) who is suffering from insomnia and sits on the roof of Nine's apartment. He tells Marina that she does not need to always make breakfast but she says it is fine. He then talks to Six momentarily before Eight takes her to spar. Nine tells John that he is basically their leader and Nine is the gun. Ella and John talk and she says she does not want to talk about her nightmares. John then goes to Nine and the rest of the Garde gather around a computer that has a news article on it. It is a crop field with the burned Loric Number Five. A few days later another article appears saying that Five is looking for them, and that he'll meet them in Arkansas. Sarah, John, and Number Six run down to Arkansas while Seven, Eight, Nine, and Ella stay behind. While Nine is passed out on the couch, Seven and Eight go on a date. Nine is angered by this and fights Eight. They all train together.

John and Six talk about their kiss in The Power of Six and work out that they are just friends. They go to Arkansas and see Number Five from a distance. John offers to go first and walks up to Five. After showing each other their scars they all begin to talk. They are attacked by Mogadorians but fight them off, and Malcolm and Sam come to help. They are all happy to see each other after Sam was taken prisoner. They all drive back to Chicago.

Ella reveals that Crayton's letter said that she was a rich man's daughter, and secretly sent off planet with the rest of the Garde. That is why she does not have the scars, and was not protected by the Charm. Nine and Marina tell her that the charm did not mean anything, and that she is Number Ten.

Nine picks on Five and Sam shortly after being introduced, but Marina tells them they will get used to it. Marina makes dinner and they exchange stories, Five is revealed to have gone from island to island before his Cepan died of a disease. He was then on the run before attempting to meet up with them. He also tells that he buried his chest in the Everglades. Malcolm informs them that Pittacus Lore had told him the Loric chests contained something that would jump start Lorien's ecosystem revival. He recalls how Pittacus died of his wounds and that he had him create the Greeters, all of whom but him, are dead. He also shares the story of Adam, and how he rescued Malcolm before they made their way to Dulce to free Sam. Then he tells of Adam's Legacy, and despite Nine's doubts, John says they will find him.

The Garde plus Sam and Sarah play capture the flag, which ends in a victory for Nine's team. Marina, Six decides to kiss John and reveal they love each other. Nine, Six, Eight, and Five all go the Everglades to retrieve Five's chest. They are attacked by a mutant crocodile which turns out to be one of Five's creations (suggesting that the giant centipede which almost killed John was also created by Five.) Five kills it and is revealed to be a traitor, knocking out Six and holding Nine underwater. He tells Eight and Marina that they have a chance to join him in the Mogadorian cause. They refuse and fight momentarily. Nine is nearly killed by Five before Eight teleports in front of him and takes a knife to the chest instead. He dies moments later. The scar burns on every Garde's legs and Marina's rage causes her to develop a new Legacy, which she uses to gouge out Five's eye. Six, Seven, and Nine make their escape.

Back at the Penthouse John and Ella lie in a coma, which is revealed to be a vision of the possible future where the planet has been taken over and all the Garde are dead but Six and Five. In this vision Ella is shown to be Setrakus' heir, and on the brink of ordering their execution. When Eight is killed, Four wakes to the scar burning in his leg. The Mogadorians invade, capture Ella and nearly kill Malcolm. John heals Malcolm instead of going after Ella. They all make their escape. Adam appears as John is leaving and they shake hands. The book ends with John saying "Okay Adam, you're going to help me win this war."

References

External links
The Lorien Legacies Official Website (United States)
The Lorien Legacies Official Website (United Kingdom)

2013 American novels
HarperCollins books
American young adult novels
American science fiction novels
2013 science fiction novels
Children's science fiction novels
Lorien Legacies